Albert Day may refer to:

 Albert Day (cricketer) (1865–1908), English cricketer for Yorkshire
 Albert Day (English footballer) (1918–1983), professional footballer for Ipswich
 Albert R. Day (1861–?), American state legislator from Maine
 Albert Day (politician) (1797–1876), American lieutenant governor of Connecticut
 Albert Day (Welsh footballer), Welsh professional footballer for Cardiff
 Albert Day (foundry), iron and brass founders in Mark, Somerset

Day, Albert